Odile Lesage (born 28 June 1969, in Paris) is a retired French heptathlete.

She finished eighth at the 1988 World Junior Championships, seventeenth at the 1991 World Championships, third at the 1993 Mediterranean Games and twelfth at the 1992 European Indoor Championships.

She is married to Stéphane Diagana with whom she has three children.

Prize list 

 World Record Holder in pentathlon in 1991, with 4451 pts
 French junior Record Holder in the heptathlon en 1988, with 5845 pts 
 French junior Record Holder in the combined events in 1987, with 5616 pts
  French Champion in heptathlon for 1989 and 1991
  French Champion in the Indoor pentathlon in 1989, 1990, 1991, 1994 et 1995
  French National High Jump Champion in 1990
  French Junior Champion in the heptathlon for 1988
  French Junior Champion for the Indoor heptathlon in 1988
  French Junior Champion for the Combined Events for 1987
  French Junior Champion for the team heptathlon in 1988
  French Junior Champion for the team combined events in 1987
  3rd  Mediterranean Games en 1993

References
 
 

1969 births
Living people
French heptathletes
French pentathletes
French female high jumpers
Athletes from Paris
Athletes (track and field) at the 1992 Summer Olympics
Olympic athletes of France
World Athletics Championships athletes for France
Mediterranean Games bronze medalists for France
Mediterranean Games medalists in athletics
Athletes (track and field) at the 1993 Mediterranean Games